The Gazette published weekly community newspapers serving Montgomery, Prince George's, Frederick, and Carroll counties in Maryland, including a subscription-based weekend edition covering business and politics throughout the state. The group of papers consistently won awards from the Suburban Newspapers of America, as well as regional awards. It was based in Gaithersburg.

In June 2015, Nash Holdings said it would close the newspapers.

History
The community newspaper group published ten Montgomery County editions (Germantown, Silver Spring/Takoma Park, Gaithersburg, Bethesda, Potomac, Burtonsville, Wheaton, Rockville, Olney and Damascus), two Carroll County editions (Mount Airy and Sykesville/Eldersburg) and eight Prince George's County editions (Largo, Hyattsville, College Park, Upper Marlboro, Bowie, Landover, Laurel and Clinton). The Gazette had been publishing weekly newspapers in the Maryland suburbs since 1959.

The Frederick County editions ceased publication in May and October 2013.

Jeff Bezos purchased the Gazette newspapers on August 5, 2013, as part of his $250 million cash purchase of the media holdings of The Washington Post Company. The transaction completed on October 1. Bezos established Nash Holdings LLC to acquire and control the Gazette.

In 2015, Nash Holdings announced it would close the Gazette, and cease publishing both its Montgomery County and Prince George's County editions. The closure, which was effective June 18, 2015, affected 69 employees and 12 reporters.

Editions
Montgomery Gazette

References

External links
 
 

Newspapers published in Maryland
The Washington Post
Newspapers established in 1959
1959 establishments in Maryland
Publications disestablished in 2015
Defunct weekly newspapers
Defunct newspapers published in Maryland